Yugen is a one-act ballet by Wayne McGregor, to Leonard Bernstein's Chichester Psalms. The ballet premiered on 15 March 2018 at the Royal Opera House, danced by The Royal Ballet.

Production

The ballet was McGregor's first new work for The Royal Ballet in two years, and was created for Bernstein's centennial. The ballet is performed by eleven dancers. The sets are designed by Edmund de Waal, a writer and potter, and features light boxes. The costumes are designed by Shirin Guild, and all dancers are in red loose-fitted outfits. The title of the ballet means the "beauty evoked with an economy of means" in Japanese (幽玄 in kanji).

Yugen is a co-production with the Dutch National Ballet, and the company will debut the ballet in September 2022. It is rescheduled from the original April 2020 date due to the COVID-19 pandemic in the Netherlands.

Original cast
Original cast:

Critical reception
The Guardian Judith Mackrell wrote, "McGregor’s choreography is expertly musical, seeking out the lyricism of Bernstein’s melodies in long, floating lines, and riding its energies in such cleverly massed configurations that his modest ensemble can look like a tribe." Roslyn Sulcas of the New York Times commented, "remains intensely responsive to the slightly strange fusion of sacred text and tone, with jazzy undercurrents in 'Chichester Psalms.'" The Evening Standard Emma Byrne wrote that Yugen "marks a new maturity: gone are the attention-grabbing pyrotechnics, and in their place just sumptuous, lyrical movement."

At the 2018 National Dance Awards, McGregor was nominated for Best Classical Choreography.

References

2018 ballet premieres
Ballets by Wayne McGregor
Ballets to the music of Leonard Bernstein
Ballets created for The Royal Ballet